The U.S. Philatelic Classics Society (USPCS) is a society dedicated to the study of United States postal issues and postal history from the Stampless era up to 1893 - i.e. before the Bureau Issues.

History
The society evolved from the Three Cent 1851-57 Unit of the American Philatelic Society. Its founding members include such famous philatelists as Dr. Carroll Chase, Stanley Bryan Ashbrook, and Leo J. Shaughnessy.

Meetings
The society holds annual meetings.

The Chronicle of the U.S. Classic Postal Issues
The society publishes its journal The Chronicle of the U.S. Classic Postal on a quarterly basis. The society also publishes a bulletin entitled Chairman’s Chatter.

Awards
The society offers a variety of awards for philatelic achievements. These include the Ashbrook Cup, the Chase Cup, the Perry Cup, the Brookman cup, the Mortimer L. Neinken Award, and the Susan M. McDonald Award.

Organization
The USPCS is governed by a set of by-laws, and is administered by a board of directors, president, vice president, secretary, assistant secretary, treasurer, and a number of officers with assigned responsibilities.

See also
 Postage stamps and postal history of the United States

References

External links
 

Philatelic organizations based in the United States
Philately of the United States